Francisca Cortés Picazo (born 20 May 1955), more commonly known as "La Paca", is a Spanish drug lord, and matriarch of the Romani drug clan known as "La Paca" clan.

The clan operated out of the predominantly Romani neighbourhood of Son Banya on the island of Majorca dealing heroin and cocaine.

Arrest
La Paca was arrested on July 2, 2008 in Son Banya, along with 19 others, by the Civil Guard in an operation dubbed Operation Kabul.

References

Further viewing
 

1955 births
Living people
Spanish drug traffickers
Spanish Romani people
Spanish female criminals
Romani organized crime groups
Female organized crime figures